The men's 5000 metres event at the 1992 World Junior Championships in Athletics was held in Seoul, Korea, at Olympic Stadium on 17 and 19 September.

Medalists

Results

Final
19 September

Heats
17 September

Heat 1

Heat 2

Participation
According to an unofficial count, 22 athletes from 16 countries participated in the event.

References

5000 metres
Long distance running at the World Athletics U20 Championships